Crooke Preceptory is a ruined church, traditionally associated with the Knights Templar and the Knights Hospitaller, in County Waterford, Ireland. It is located in the townland of Crooke and the present day parish of Killea Crooke and Faithlegg. The church is associated with the nearby (13th century) Crook Castle tower house.

History 
Crooke Preceptory was founded sometime before 1180. Together with nearby Crooke Castle, the site passed to the Knights Hospitallers of Killure in 1327. It was seized at the time of destruction of the monasteries in 1541, and its possessions were reduced to 120 acres. It is thought to have become a parish church of Crooke, with records describing the church as being "in good repair" as of 1613.

Structures
There is "evidence of one window in the S[outh] chancel wall", a "doorway in the S[outh] nave wall with a stoup nearby", with three lancet windows on the church gable.

Surrounded by cut-stone walls ("that are 16th/17th century in character") there is a holy well site and ruined tower house nearby. While only two walls and the remains of a destroyed staircase survive, mid-19th century records suggest that a barrel vault then "partly survived".

References

Notes

Sources

 
 
 
 
 
 
 
 

Knights Templar
Preceptories of the Knights Hospitaller
Christian monasteries in the Republic of Ireland
Religious buildings and structures in County Waterford
Ruins in the Republic of Ireland